Sydney Jeanene Batch is a Democratic member of the North Carolina General Assembly, who has represented the state's 17th Senate district since 2021 and formerly represented the State's 37th House district from 2019 until 2021.

Education and legal career
Batch received her B.A. Degree in English, her Juris Doctor Degree, and a master's degree in social work all from the University of North Carolina at Chapel Hill.

Batch has practiced law since 2005 at her firm in Raleigh, North Carolina. Batch practices divorce law, child custody law, and child welfare law. In 2019, Batch was recognized by Super Lawyers as a top attorney in family law in Raleigh, North Carolina.

Political career
Batch defeated John Adcock in the November 2018 general election. Batch won by a margin of 50 percent to 48 percent.  She lost her 2020 reelection race to Erin Pare. On January 11, 2021, Batch was appointed to the North Carolina Senate for District 17.

References

|-

Democratic Party North Carolina state senators
Batch, Sydney
Living people
21st-century American politicians
21st-century American women politicians
Women state legislators in North Carolina
1979 births